Fiery Dragon Productions is a role-playing game and wargame publisher.

History
Fiery Dragon Productions was founded in Toronto in 2000 by authors James Bell, Jason Kempton and Todd Secord. They got into the business to publish d20 adventures and their first, Nemoren's Vault (2000), was an early entrant to the field. After publishing just two more adventures – The Silver Summoning (2001) and To Stand on Hallowed Ground/Swords Against Deception (2001), the latter by Mike Mearls – Fiery Dragon was invited to become a part of the Sword & Sorcery imprint at White Wolf. They were the fourth publisher in the imprint, following Necromancer Games and two White Wolf divisions, Sword & Sorcery Studios and ArtHaus. One of their early supplements offered some support for Necromancer Games' first Rappan Athuk adventure (2001) and even after Fiery Dragon left Sword & Sorcery in 2002, they continued working with Monte Cook's Malhavoc Press.

Though Fiery Dragon got its start in adventures – and published a few more at Sword & Sorcery – they increasingly were moving toward publishing counters, which they had begun in their first adventure, Nemoren's Vault by including a few illustrated counters to represent characters and monsters. Fiery Dragon continued inserting counters into their adventures through 2002 but by that time they had retained the services of artist Claudio Pozas. Pozas allowed them to create counters in volume, and the result was Counter Collection I: The Usual Suspects (2001), a Sword & Sorcery publication and the first of many books (and later boxes and tins) that contained counters and nothing else.

By 2003 and 2004, Fiery Dragon was publishing almost nothing but counters, and two publications at the time were Counter Collection 5: Summoned Creatures (2004) and Counter Collection Gold (2004), which together depicted the entire span of base 3.5e creatures. Prior to 2004, all of Fiery Dragons adventures – and some of their Counter Collections – were based in their own world of Karathis. In 2005, they returned to publishing things other than counters but instead of their traditional setting, they instead turned to licensed backgrounds. The majority of their licences were taken from Malhavoc Press, and Fiery Dragon thus put out adventures and counters for both Arcana Evolved (2005) and Ptolus (2006-2007). They also became the primary publisher for the Iron Heroes d20 game (2005-2008).

Fiery Dragon also published the seventh edition of Tunnels & Trolls (2005, 2008) and a fourth-edition D&D book that updates the best of White Wolf's Creature Collection (2009). They have also published a number of "Counter Strike" mini-games. With the publication of D&D fourth edition, Fiery Dragon began mostly publishing counters once more.

Products
Key products include:
Tunnels & Trolls 30th Anniversary Edition
Ptolus campaign setting for Dungeons & Dragons
Arcana Evolved campaign setting for Dungeons & Dragons
Iron Heroes campaign setting for Dungeons & Dragons
Counterstrike Wargames line of small wargames.

References

External links

Role-playing game publishing companies